In Hong Kong, wet markets are traditional markets that sell fresh meat, produce, and other perishable goods. There are wet markets in most neighbourhoods of Hong Kong and they often cater to older residents, low-income residents, and domestic workers. They are regulated by the Food and Environmental Hygiene Department (FEHD).

Early history

On 16 May 1842, Central Market was opened in a central position on Queen's Road in Hong Kong. In this market, people could find all kinds of meat, fruit and vegetables, poultry, salt fish, fresh fish, weighing rooms and money changers.

In 1920, the Reclamation Street Market was opened in Hong Kong. Due to structural problems, Reclamation Street Market was removed by the government in 1953. In 1957, Yau Ma Tei Street Market launched to replace the Reclamation Street Market. There were fixed-pitch stalls which sold vegetables, fruits, seafood, beef, pork, and poultry. Also, there were stalls selling baby chickens, baby ducks, and three-striped box turtles as pets.

Popularity

In 1994, wet markets accounted for 70% of produce sales and 50% of meat sales in Hong Kong.

In Hong Kong, wet markets are most frequented by older residents, those with lower incomes, and domestic helpers who serve approximately 10 percent of Hong Kong's residents. Most neighbourhoods contain at least one wet market. Wet markets have become destinations for tourists to "see the real Hong Kong".

Ownership
In 2018, the FEHD operated 74 wet markets housing approximately 13,070 stalls. In addition, the Hong Kong Housing Authority operated 21 markets while private developers operated about 99 (in 2017). As of 2018, planning is underway for new wet markets in the new towns at Tung Chung, Tin Shui Wai, Hung Shui Kiu, Tseung Kwan O, and Kwu Tung North. Since many of the wet market buildings are owned by private property investment firms, the prices of food can vary from market to market.

Practices
Hong Kong's wet markets are known to use red lampshades to make the food look fresher.

Inhumane slaughter methods are often used, including air asphyxiation of large numbers of live fish. According to a Dutch study, it takes 55-250 minutes for various species of fish to become insensible during this process.

Regulations

Prior to 2000, many of Hong Kong's wet markets were managed by the Urban Council (within Hong Kong Island and Kowloon) or the Regional Council (in the New Territories). Since the disbandment of the two councils on 31 December 1999, these markets have been managed by the Food and Environmental Hygiene Department (FEHD) of the Hong Kong government.

Markets in Hong Kong are governed by the law of Hong Kong. Under the Slaughterhouse Regulation, the slaughtering of live bovine animals, swine, goats, sheep or soliped for human consumption must take place in a licensed slaughterhouse, None of the wet markets in Hong Kong hold wild or exotic animals.

Poultry
The retail sale of live poultry in Hong Kong is permitted at licensed outlets only. At the end of 2016, there were 85 retail shops within public wet markets licensed to sell live poultry.

In 2008, the government of Hong Kong proposed that all poultry should be slaughtered at central abattoirs to combat the spread of avian flu. The FEHD has implemented a number of measures to reduce the risk of avian influenza. Regular inspections and cleaning take place, including nightly disinfection of each stall by external contractors. Stall owners selling live poultry are not allowed to keep the animals on the premises overnight; they must be slaughtered before 8:00 pm nightly.

See also
 Wet markets in China

References

Animal trade
Food markets
Retail markets in Hong Kong